Mauritius competed at the 2019 African Games held from 19 to 31 August 2019 in Rabat, Morocco. In total, athletes representing the country won six gold medals, six silver medals and twelve bronze medals and the country finished 8th in the medal table.

Medal summary

Medal table 

|  style="text-align:left; width:78%; vertical-align:top;"|

|  style="text-align:left; width:22%; vertical-align:top;"|

Archery 

Jean Marie Cliff Babet, Ryan Chan Yam and Stephan Klein represented Mauritius in archery in the men's individual recurve and men's team recurve events.

Athletics 

Jonathan Drack won the bronze medal in the men's triple jump event, the only medal won by athletes representing Mauritius in athletics.

Jonathan Bardottier and Noah Bibi represented Mauritius in the men's 100 metres event. Bardottier advanced to compete in the semifinals and Bibi did not advance to compete in the semifinals.

Bardottier also competed in the men's 200 metres event. In this event he also advanced to compete in the semifinals but he did not qualify to compete in the final.

Badminton 

Mauritius entered six players (3 men's and 3 women's) at the Games.

In total, badminton players representing Mauritius won one gold medal, one silver medal and one bronze medal.

Julien Paul and Aatish Lubah won the gold medal in the men's doubles event.

Julien Paul won the silver medal in the men's singles event.

Julien Paul and Aurélie Allet won the bronze medal in the mixed doubles event.

Boxing 

Mauritius competed in boxing. Boxers representing Mauritius won one gold medal and one silver medal and the country finished in 6th place in the boxing medal table.

Chess 

Marie Patrick Claude Emmanuel, Naipai Hoolan, Aamirah Beekhy Bibi and Uvika Essoo represented Mauritius in chess.

Cycling 

Mauritius competed in mountain bike cycling.

Fencing 

Satya Gunput, the only athlete to represent Mauritius in fencing, won the bronze medal in the Men's Individual Épée event.

Judo 

Nine athletes represented Mauritius in judo: Hansley Jeffrey Patrice Adonis, Louis Daniel Begue, Noemie Evenor, Rémi Feuillet, Kimberley Jean Pierre, Joseph Sebastien Perrine, Daniellito Rosidor-Perrine, Marie Chrystina Speville and Marie Sarah Samuelle Sylva.

Rémi Feuillet won a bronze medal in the men's −90 kg event.

Sébastien Perrine won a bronze medal in the men's +100 kg event.

Karate 

Hans Ramdharrysing, Kushal Mohabeer, Abishek Aman Kavi Ramluchumun, Roddy Shane Wong Fat Lai Kin and Jean Paul Baniatti Jean Louis represented Mauritius in karate.

Swimming 

Gregory Anodin, Jonathan Chung Yee, Ruth Tessa Chun Kiaw Ip Hen Cheung, Camille Koenig and Mathieu Marquet competed in swimming.

Table tennis 

Mauritius competed in table tennis.

Taekwondo 

One athlete represented Mauritius in Taekwondo.

Triathlon 

Timothee Guy Hugnin and Jean Gael Laurent L'Entete competed in the men's triathlon event and finished in 4th and 12th place respectively.

Lisa-marie Chloe Laetitia D'Autriche competed in the women's triathlon event. She finished in 9th place with a time of 1:18:57.

Volleyball 

Both the men's team and women's team were scheduled to compete.

Weightlifting 

Weightlifters representing Mauritius won three gold medals and six bronze medals and the country finished in 5th place in the weightlifting medal table.

Wrestling 

Four athletes represented Mauritius in wrestling.

Men's freestyle

Women's freestyle

See also
 Mauritius at the African Games

References 

Nations at the 2019 African Games
2019
African Games